Orilesa caminosa is a species of moth   of the family Tortricidae. It is found in the Democratic Republic of Congo (Équateur) and Ethiopia.

References

Moths described in 2012
Archipini